Women's Corps may refer to one of the following:

Active military units
 Sri Lanka Army Women's Corps
 Women's Affairs advisor, an Israel Defense Forces unit (formerly Women's Corps)

Defunct military units
 Canadian Women's Army Corps, active between World War II and 1964
 Women's Royal Army Corps, active between 1949 and 1992
 Women's Army Corps (United States Army), active between 1942 and 1978